The Favorite (also titled Intimate Power) is a 1989 Swiss-American historical drama film based on the unsubstantiated story of Aimée du Buc de Rivéry that takes place at the dawn of the 19th century. It was the final film of director Jack Smight.

Premise
A young French woman named Aimee is kidnapped and forced into a Sultan's harem in the Ottoman Empire. Fiercely independent, she resists, but must make choices in order to survive. She begins to influence the Sultan toward more fair manners of solving his conflicts, but finds herself at odds with another one of his wives, who wants her son Mustafa to become the new sultan. As the years pass, she must deal with the new Sultan's advances while protecting her adopted son Mahmud, and helping the Ottoman Empire against Russia during the Russo-Turkish War of 1787–1792.

The source for the story is a novel by Prince Michael of Greece and Denmark titled Sultana - La Nuit du Serail.

Cast
F. Murray Abraham as Abdul Hamid
Maud Adams as Sineperver
Amber O'Shea as Aimée Dubucq de Rivéry
Ron Dortch as Tulip
James Michael Gregary as Selim
Laurent Le Doyen as Sebastiani
Francesco Quinn as adult Mahmud
Andréa Parisy as Mihrişah
Tom McGreevey as Uncle (as Thomas McGreevey)
Celeste Simpson-Boyd as Zinah
Robere Kazadi as Orchid
Garth Wilton as British Consul
Reuven Bar-Yotam as Algerian Captain
Farouk Peker as Baktar
John Kennedy Hayden as Chief Janissary
Mike Johnson as First Mate
Thomas Rosales Jr. as Third Mate
Michael Saad as Jeweler
Dale Dye as French Officer
Joseph Darrell as Manservant
Ayse Gungor as Harem Girl
Starr Andreeff as Harem Girl
Erica Zeitlin as Harem Girl
Victoria Dakil as Old Woman
Roz Witt as Nun
George Marshall Ruge as Kamir
 Joe El Rady as Boy at the bazar
Jonathan Vuille as Young Mahmud
Glenn Scarpelli as Mustafa

Production
Director: Jack Smight
Production Company: Ascona Films, Inc.

The film was shot in Turkey. Smight says half way through the production the producer Georges-Alain Vuille, ran out of money so a company run by Steve Friedman took over the film. Smith finished the film "and in my estimation, it turned out better than expected, but once again 'into oblivion'."

Sources
Jason Ankeny, Allmovie.

References

External links
 

1989 films
Films based on Danish novels
American independent films
Swiss drama films
1989 independent films
English-language Swiss films
1980s adventure drama films
Films set in the 1780s
Films set in the 1790s
Films set in the 1800s
Films set in the Ottoman Empire
Films directed by Jack Smight
American adventure drama films
1989 crime drama films
1980s English-language films
1980s American films